Hessenford is a village in Cornwall, England, UK.

Hessenford may also refer to:

 St Anne's Church, Hessenford
 Hessenford railway station, a proposed but unbuilt railway station